Barton Childs (February 29, 1916 – February 18, 2010) was an American pediatrician and geneticist. He was born in Chicago, Illinois, and graduated from Williams College in 1938. In 1942, he received his M.D. from Johns Hopkins University. Following military service in World War II, he returned to Johns Hopkins for a residency in pediatrics.  After a fellowship at Boston Children's Hospital in Boston, he returned to Johns Hopkins University in 1949, where he remained until his retirement in 1981. He remained a professor emeritus in the Department of Pediatrics at The Johns Hopkins University School of Medicine until his death.

Childs studied the genetics of adrenal hyperplasia, Crigler–Najjar syndrome, and propionic acidemia. He is known for his collaboration with William H. Zinkham, which demonstrated that Glucose-6-phosphate dehydrogenase deficiency is an X-linked recessive genetic disease. He is best known for a collaboration with Ronald Davidson and Harold Nitowsky, which demonstrated random inactivation of one of the two X-chromosomes in mammalian female cells, a mechanism of dosage compensation.

Childs was the author of many editorial pieces on genetic counseling, genetic screening, and behavioral genetics. He was a coauthor of The Metabolic and Molecular Bases of Inherited Disease, published in four volumes. In his book Genetic Medicine: A Logic of Disease, published in 1999, he argues that in the future, all medicine, or medical theory, must be based on the individuality of gene-environment interaction.

Awards and honors
 1959 E. Mead Johnson Award from the Society for Pediatric Research 
 1973 William Allan Award from the American Society of Human Genetics
 1989 John Howland Award from the American Pediatric Society
 1998 Joseph Zubin Award from the American Psychopathological Association.

References

Johns Hopkins School of Medicine alumni
Williams College alumni
Medical geneticists
American geneticists
American pediatricians
Johns Hopkins University faculty
1916 births
2010 deaths
American military personnel of World War II
Members of the National Academy of Medicine